Princess of Mars (retitled and re-released in 2012 as John Carter of Mars) is a 2009 direct-to-DVD science fiction film made by American independent studio The Asylum, loosely based on the 1917 novel A Princess of Mars by author Edgar Rice Burroughs. The film's promotional art mentions how the original story inspired some elements of James Cameron's 2009 film Avatar, but neither the credits nor promotional material mention Edgar Rice Burroughs. It is not to be confused with the higher-budget 2012 film John Carter, which is an adaptation of the novel. In the UK, the film was released with the title The Martian Colony Wars.

Plot
John Carter is a modern-day U.S. Army sniper serving in Afghanistan, wounded in the line of duty and used in a teleportation experiment wherein he is transferred to Barsoom, a planet outside of Earth's solar system, where he exhibits the ability to leap amazing distances. Initially enslaved by the Tharks, he earns a rank among them and later saves a rival group's princess, the human-looking Dejah Thoris, from death.

The group of Tharks, led by Tars Tarkas, takes Carter to their leader Tal Hajus, guarded by Tars Tarkas' daughter Sola. Learning that Tarkas gave Carter a military rank only Hajus can give, Tarkas and Carter are forced to duel. Upon winning, Carter faces Sarka, an Afghan mercenary who had betrayed him. When Sarka escapes, Carter helps Tarkas kill Hajus and become the new leader of the Tharks.

Captain Carter then learns that Dejah Thoris has fled to the planetary air-cleaning station that keeps Barsoom habitable, which Sarka damages, causing the atmosphere to deteriorate. John Carter and Sarka face each other in a duel, but Sarka is killed by an insect during the fight. After Carter and Dejah Thoris reactivate the station, Carter is returned to Earth, where he declines to tell his superiors about his adventures for fear they will colonize Barsoom, and returns to military duties while hoping one day to return to the planet.

Cast
 Antonio Sabato Jr. as John Carter
 Traci Lords as Dejah Thoris
 Matt Lasky as Tars Tarkas
 Chacko Vadaketh as Sarka / Sab Than
 Mitchell Gordon as Tal Hajus
 Noelle Perris as Sola

Production
This film makes extensive use of the Vasquez Rocks for its alien landscape, appearing throughout the film as different locations.

See also
List of films set on Mars

References

External links
 Princess of Mars at The Asylum
 

2009 independent films
2009 films
2009 science fiction films
2009 direct-to-video films
American science fiction films
The Asylum films
Mockbuster films
Barsoom
Films about extraterrestrial life
Films based on works by Edgar Rice Burroughs
Films shot in California
Mars in film
War in Afghanistan (2001–2021) films
Films directed by Mark Atkins
Films based on American novels
Films based on science fiction novels
Sword and planet films
2000s English-language films
2000s American films
English-language science fiction films